Georgia Wettlin Larsen is a Nakota singer who has released several discs featuring Native American songs. Perhaps her most famous performance was when her song "Ojibway Square Dance" was featured during the fourth-season episode "Learning Curve" of Northern Exposure. Learning Curve originally aired on February 8, 1993.

She has served as Program Director for the First Nations Composer Initiative in St. Paul, Minnesota.

Discography 
 Heartbeat: Voices of First Nations Women
 Lakota Flute Song	
 Ojibwa Love Charm Song
 Ojibwa Love Song 
Wood That Sings: Indian Fiddle Music of the Americas 
Turkey in the Straw

References 

Year of birth missing (living people)
Living people
20th-century Native Americans
Assiniboine people
Native American singers
Native American women